Arno Bieberstein (October 24, 1884 in Magdeburg – July 7, 1918 in Magdeburg) was a German backstroke swimmer who competed in the 1908 Summer Olympics.

He won a gold medal in the 100 metre backstroke event and did not compete in any other competition.

In 1906 and 1907 he became German champion in backstroke as member of his homebased SC Hellas Magdeburg.

Notes and references

External links
dataOlympics profile
ISHOF profile

1884 births
1918 deaths
Male backstroke swimmers
German male swimmers
Olympic swimmers of Germany
Swimmers at the 1908 Summer Olympics
Olympic gold medalists for Germany
Sportspeople from Magdeburg
Medalists at the 1908 Summer Olympics
Olympic gold medalists in swimming